Marcus Publicius Malleolus was a Roman statesman who served as Consul.

Biography
He built, with his brother, a temple dedicated to the goddess Flora and instituted the Floralia. He was elected Consul in 232 BC with Marcus Aemilius Lepidus. They served during a transition period between the First and the Second Punic War.

Bibliography
 William Smith, Dictionary of Greek and Roman Biography and Mythology, 1, Boston: Little, Brown and Company, Vol.2 p.908 n.1

Year of birth unknown
Year of death unknown
3rd-century BC Roman consuls
Plebeian aediles
Malleolus, Marcus